Nedo Farčić (born 12 October 1941) is a Yugoslav long-distance runner. He competed in the marathon at the 1968 Summer Olympics.

Personal bests

References

1941 births
Living people
Athletes (track and field) at the 1968 Summer Olympics
Yugoslav male long-distance runners
Croatian male long-distance runners
Yugoslav male marathon runners
Croatian male marathon runners
Olympic athletes of Yugoslavia
People from Vela Luka